Javier Filardi (born 7 February 1980) is an Argentine volleyball player. He was part of the Argentina men's national volleyball team at the 2014 FIVB Volleyball Men's World Championship in Poland. He played with UPCN San Juan.
Last year he won the Bronze Medal I Brazil and this year he was part of the team that won the South America Clubs Championship.

Clubs
 UPCN San Juan (2013-)

References

1980 births
Living people
Argentine men's volleyball players
Place of birth missing (living people)
Pan American Games gold medalists for Argentina
Pan American Games medalists in volleyball
Volleyball players at the 2015 Pan American Games
Medalists at the 2015 Pan American Games